Szczepankowo may refer to:

Szczepankowo, part of the district of Nowe Miasto (Poznań)
Szczepankowo, Greater Poland Voivodeship (west-central Poland)
Szczepankowo, Kuyavian-Pomeranian Voivodeship (north-central Poland)
Szczepankowo, Podlaskie Voivodeship (north-east Poland)
Szczepankowo, Iława County in Warmian-Masurian Voivodeship (north Poland)
Szczepankowo, Ostróda County in Warmian-Masurian Voivodeship (north Poland)
Szczepankowo, Szczytno County in Warmian-Masurian Voivodeship (north Poland)